Ally Kleist Sykes (10 October 1926 – 19 May 2013)  was a veteran Tanzanian politician  and one of the 17 founders of the Tanganyika African National Union.

Early life and career
Ally was born on 10 October 1926 in Dar es Salaam to Kleist Sykes during the British rule of Tanganyika.

He served in the King's African Rifles during World War II .

Personal life
He had two brothers Abulwahid and Abbas. He served as a trustee of the Tanzanian Premier League club Simba S.C.

Death and funeral
He died of heart failure on 19 May 2013 at the Aga Khan Hospital in Nairobi, Kenya and was buried the next day at the Kisutu Cemetery in Dar es Salaam. His funeral was attended by President Jakaya Kikwete, former presidents Ali Hassan Mwinyi and Benjamin Mkapa, CCM senior officials Philip Mangula and Abdulrahman Kinana.

References

External links
Ally Sykes – the Zulu who shook the colonial tree II

1926 births
2013 deaths
People from Dar es Salaam
Tanganyika African National Union politicians